Jérôme Agossa Bonou (born 27 November 1994) is a Beninese footballer who plays as a midfielder for ASPAC FC.

References

1996 births
Living people
Beninese footballers
Benin international footballers
AS Onze Créateurs de Niaréla players
ASPAC FC players
Association football midfielders